Osarizawaite is a greenish yellow sulfate mineral with the chemical formula: PbCuAl2(SO4)2(OH)6. It has rhombohedral crystals.

It was first described in 1961 for an occurrence in the oxidized zone of the Osarizawa mine, Akita Prefecture, Honshu Island, Japan.

References

Alunite group
Sulfate minerals
Trigonal minerals
Minerals in space group 166